The Hawaiian blackhead triplefin (Enneapterygius atriceps), also known as the Hawaiian triplefin in Hawaii, is a species of triplefin blenny in the genus Enneapterygius. It is a tropical blenny found in coral reefs in the Pacific Ocean, from the Hawaiian Islands, French Frigate Shoals, Laysan Island, and Midway Atoll. Blennies in this species swim at a depth range of 1–23 metres, and inhabit dead coral and rock.

It was originally described by O.P. Jenkins in 1903, as a species of Tripterygion, but was reassigned to Enneapterygius by R. Fricke in 1997.

Description
The Hawaiian blackhead triplefin is considered part of the Enneapterygius hemimelas species group. It is considered a small or medium member of the group, with males reaching a maximum length of 2.6 centimetres. Males can be distinguished from females by their dark head colouring.

References

External links
 Enneapterygius atriceps at www.fishwise.co.za
 Enneapterygius atriceps at www.discoverlife.org
 Enneapterygius atriceps at www.marinelifephotography.com
 Enneapterygius atriceps at ITIS
 Enneapterygius atriceps at World Register of Marine Species

Hawaiian blackhead triplefiin
Fish described in 1903
Taxa named by Oliver Peebles Jenkins